Saffron Herndon is a young American comedian who rose to fame in September 2015 after images embedded with her stand-up material went viral on Reddit when she was ten years old.

Reception
The Huffington Post described her as having "a better command of the stage and material than humans three times her age".

Media
On October 2, 2015, Saffron made her television debut performing on The Today Show.  In September, 2016 A&E ordered a 10-episode documentary series about Saffron entitled Little Funny. All primary filming was completed in the summer of 2017, but A&E subsequently canceled the program before it aired.

Saffron was on an episode of Podcast But Outside

References

External links
 

21st-century American comedians
American women comedians
Living people
Year of birth missing (living people)
21st-century American women